Kostas Kapnisis (1920–2007) was a Greek composer. He was born in Athens and studied piano at the Hellenic Conservatory. He was also taught by Nikos Skalkottas.

He wrote music and soundtracks for over 100 Greek movies, documentaries and theatre.
He died in Athens in 2007.

Sources

1920 births
2007 deaths
Greek composers
Greek film score composers
Male film score composers
20th-century male musicians
Musicians from Athens